Eoanthidium is a genus of bees in the Megachilidae family.

Description
Eoanthidium generally have elongate, slender bodies with black integument and yellow maculations. Their body length ranges from 6–10 mm.

Distribution 
Eoanthidium occurs in the eastern Mediterranean, southwestern Asia, southern Russia, southern India, Pakistan, and Africa.

Taxonomy 
Eoanthidium contains the following 4 subgenera:

 Clistanthidium
 Eoanthidium
 Hemidiellum
 Salemanthidium

Species 
Eoanthidium contains at least 17 species:

References 

Megachilidae
Insects described in 1950